The Albania women's national basketball team represents Albania in international women's basketball competitions, and is controlled by the Albanian Basketball Association.

History
Albania women's national basketball team are quite successful in European Basketball. Being successful at the Mediterranean Games an international sports competition they would win successfully in 1987 at the finals against the women's from Turkey, in their first ever appearance.

The Albanian women's would compete in two competitions such as the International Mediterranean Games in which, they qualify three times for Basketball at the Mediterranean Games first in basketball at the 1987 Mediterranean Games in Latakia , Syria. Then in 1991 in Athens, Greece and recently in 2009 in Pescara, Italy. The Albanian women's would also compete at the FIBA Women's European Championship for Small Countries three times as well in their history first in 1996. Winning this tournament in 2002 against Iceland in the finals.

The Albanian women's national basketball team are the most successful national team for Albania in basketball winning two gold medals in European and International competitions. First in 1987 and in 2002 as well. They would also win two silver medals at the Small Countries tournament first in 1996 and later in 2008. They won four medals in their successful basketball history.

Mediterranean Games
Their biggest success came in their first ever appearance in Basketball at the 1987 Mediterranean Games in Latakia in which they would beat the Turkey women's national basketball team in the finals to win this competition, in their first ever appearance. It is their one and only international competition win in their history. Despite that it is the biggest success for Albania in International or European Basketball.

In their next two appearances the Albanian women could not repeat the success they had in their first campaign. In their next campaign in Basketball at the 1991 Mediterranean Games in Greece. The Albanian women's were not able to repeat their success and finish fifth at the end behind Spain, France and Greece.

The Albanian women's would lately compete for the Basketball at the 2009 Mediterranean Games in Italy. In Group A they would face Croatia and Italy. The Albanian women's were this time without any chances losing both matches heavily in the process. Albania would then receive a bye in the semifinals for the fifth place bracket, owing to the competition having only seven nations participating. It would be their final appearance in any international competition todate for the Albanian women's national basketball team.

2009 Mediterranean Games
Preliminary Round

June 27, 2009

June 28, 2009

The Albania women's team would then face Turkey in the finals. This time around they couldn't beat the opposition like they did previously in their winning campaign. They would lose despite an improved performance at the end with 60–89. Finishing their third and final appearance in the Mediterranean Games at the 6th place out of seven nations.

Final for the 5th place
 60 - 89

Small countries championships (1996 - 2008)
The Albanian women's would also participate three times in the FIBA Women's European Championship for Small Countries first in 1996 and for the latest participation in Luxemburg 2008 as well. Showing in all of the three tournaments they participated some good results. In their first participation in the Small Countries championship in Malta 1996 the Albanian women would lose in the finals against Iceland with a result of 81–73 at the end.
Albania then once again competed in this Competition in Andorra 2002 this time around the Albanian women's took revenge on Iceland and would win this competition for the first time with an impressive display, they could beat them with a result of 84–79 in the process. It was for the Albanian women their second gold medal in any European or World Basketball competition in their history. Winning all of their five matches in their campaign. Still their latest title win in their Basketball history. In their third and final campaign in the Small Countries Championship in 2008 Luxemburg edition. For the third time straight they would reach the finals in this competition but lost at the finals against Malta with 61-81 missing out on their second title at this tournament.

FIBA Women's European Championship for Small Countries in Valletta 1996 
For the Albanian women's national Basketball team their first final in nine years and it is their first medal win in nine years as well. Winning at the end the silver medal in the process.

Final
 81 - 73

FIBA Women's European Championship for Small Countries in Andorra 2002 
For the Albanian women's national Basketball team their first gold medal in this competition. Their second final against the Iceland women's national basketball team as well. It would be their first gold medal in 15 years after their win at the 1987 Mediterranean Games in Syria. It is for the Albanian women's their last gold medal.

Final
 84–79

FIBA Women's European Championship for Small Countries in Luxemburg 2008 
Despite the loss against the Malta women's national basketball team Albania would win silver once again. The Albanian women's would reach, in all off their three appearances, the final at this tournament after six years of wait.  They won their third and final medal at this competition. One gold and two silver medals at the end. It would be until this day their last final they would participate as a Basketball National team in their history.

Final
 81 - 61 

The Albanians women's could not qualify for any other tournament since their latest participation in Basketball at the 2009 Mediterranean Games.

Competitions

FIBA Women's European Championship for Small Countries

Mediterranean Games

Team

Current roster

|}
| valign="top" |
 Head coach

Legend
Club – describes lastclub before the competition
Age – describes ageas of 19 July 2015
|}

See also
 Albania women's national under-19 basketball team
 Albania women's national under-17 basketball team
 Albania men's national basketball team

References

External links
Albanian Basketball Association (Official website)
Albanian Women National Team at eurobasket.com

 
Women's national basketball teams